Instituto de Plasmas e Fusão Nuclear (IPFN) (Institute for Plasmas and Nuclear Fusion) is a research unit of Instituto Superior Técnico (IST), Lisbon, and a leading Portuguese institution in physics research. IPFN has the status of Associate Laboratory in the thematic areas of controlled nuclear fusion, plasma technologies and intense lasers, granted by the Portuguese Foundation for Science and Technology.

IPFN was formally created in January 2008, as a result of the merging between the former research units Center for Nuclear Fusion and Center for Plasma Physics. As of 2015, almost 190 people work at IPFN, of which more than 100 are PhDs.

Organization
IPFN is organized in seven research groups: Engineering and Systems Integration, Experimental Physics, Materials Processing and Characterisation, Theory and Modelling, Lasers and Plasmas, Gas Discharges and Gaseous Electronics, and High Pressure Plasmas. The activities in the frame of the Associate Laboratory are evaluated by an External Evaluation Committee. IPFN is also the research unit of the Contract of Association between EURATOM and IST, in force since 1990. These activities are coordinated by the Head of Research Unit and monitored by a steering committee.

Main research fields
IPFN activities are centered on the following competences:

 Magnetic Confinement Fusion Devices
 Fusion Engineering Systems
 Fusion Theory and Modelling
 Inertial fusion
 Laser-Plasma Accelerators
 High-Performance Computing
 Relativistic Astrophysics
 Novel Radiation Sources
 Ultra Intense Photonics
 Space Physics
 Environmental Plasma Engineering Laboratory
 Kinetics in Plasmas and Afterglows
 Modelling of Plasma Sources
 Quantum Plasmas

See also
 Instituto Superior Técnico

References

External links
 Instituto de Plasmas e Fusão Nuclear (official page)

Research institutes in Portugal
Fusion power
Plasma physics facilities
Physics institutes
Tokamaks
University of Lisbon